Wing Kwong Pentecostal Holiness Church is a church located at 22 Heng Lam Street, in Lok Fu, Wong Tai Sin District, Hong Kong. The current building was completed in 2000.

Design
The church was designed by TaoHo Design Architects. The 60m high building was conceived as a "giant bookshelf". It contains a covered assembly ground, an assembly hall, a chapel, classrooms and offices. The different church's elements are "stacked" upon one another. The church design won a Certificate of Merit of the HKIA in 2000.

References

External links

 Church's website. Includes virtual tour and photo gallery.

Lok Fu
Protestant churches in Hong Kong
Pentecostal denominations in Asia